Vignate railway station is a railway station in Italy. Located on the Milan–Venice railway, it serves the town of Vignate.

Services 
The station is served by lines S5 and S6 of the Milan suburban railway network, operated by the Lombard railway company Trenord.

See also 
 Milan suburban railway network

References

Railway stations in Lombardy
Milan S Lines stations